Scott County is a county located in the U.S. state of Mississippi. As of the 2020 census, the population was 27,990. Its county seat is Forest. The county is named for Abram M. Scott, the Governor of Mississippi from 1832 to 1833.

Geography

It is an approximately 45 minute driving distance from Jackson.

Major highways
  Interstate 20
  U.S. Highway 80
  Mississippi Highway 13
  Mississippi Highway 21
  Mississippi Highway 35

Adjacent counties
 Leake County (north)
 Newton County (east)
 Smith County (south)
 Rankin County (west)
 Madison County (northwest)

National protected area
 Bienville National Forest (part)

History
This area was developed by European Americans for cotton plantations. After the American Civil War, many freedmen worked as sharecroppers or tenant farmers on the plantations. In 1890 the state legislature disenfranchised most blacks, who were a majority in the state, by creating barriers to voter registration; it also passed Jim Crow laws, treating freedmen and their descendants as second-class citizens.

From 1877 to 1950, there were nine lynchings of blacks in Scott County. It was a form of racial terrorism that was at its height at the turn of the 20th century.

On October 23–25, 1898, a "race war" erupted in Harperville, an unincorporated community in Scott County, after blacks resisted one of their community being arrested for an alleged conflict with his white employer. They fatally shot a white deputy and wounded three others. A mob of whites gathered that night and started hunting down and killing black suspects, killing nine to eleven black men by the end of the following day. Sources vary in the count of fatalities, and some blacks were buried before being identified or counted. The county sheriff arrested some black suspects and took them first to the county seat at Forest, and then to Meridian for their safety. Associated Press and major newspapers covered the events.

Demographics

2020 census

As of the 2020 United States Census, there were 27,990 people, 10,180 households, and 7,015 families residing in the county.

2010 census
As of the 2010 census, there were 28,264 people, 10,248 households, and 7,264 families residing in the county. The population density was 46.4 people per square mile (18/km2). There were 11,470 housing units at an average density of 18 per square mile (7/km2). The racial makeup of the county was 53.3% White, 37.5% Black or African American, 0.31% Native American, 0.2% Asian, 0.2% Pacific Islander, 7.2% from other races, and 1.4% from two or more races. 10.7% of the population were Hispanic or Latino (6.3% Mexican, 1.5% Guatemalan, 0.7% Cuban).

There were 10,183 households, out of which 36.20% had children under the age of 18 living with them, 49.80% were married couples living together, 18.80% had a female householder with no husband present, and 26.00% were non-families. 22.20% of all households were made up of individuals, and 10.00% had someone living alone who was 65 years of age or older. The average household size was 2.76 and the average family size was 3.21.

In the county, the population was spread out, with 28.60% under the age of 18, 9.60% from 18 to 24, 27.90% from 25 to 44, 21.40% from 45 to 64, and 12.40% who were 65 years of age or older. The median age was 34 years. For every 100 females there were 94.40 males. For every 100 females age 18 and over, there were 90.10 males.

The median income for a household in the county was $26,686, and the median income for a family was $31,487. Males had a median income of $26,406 versus $18,459 for females. The per capita income for the county was $14,013. About 16.50% of families and 20.70% of the population were below the poverty line, including 26.80% of those under age 18 and 22.70% of those age 65 or over.

Government
The Scott County Sheriff's office provides the equivalent of County law enforcement for both unincorporated cities as well as incorporated cities within the county. The Scott County Sheriff is the oldest elected position in Scott County. The Scott County Sheriff's Office has 63 employees, both sworn and non-sworn.  It is divided into six divisions; Administration, patrol, criminal investigations, narcotics, communications, and detention. The Sheriff's office operates the County Jail; it provides detention services under contract to the City of Forest Police Department and to the Mississippi Department of Corrections.

In 2010 the County opened a new state-of-the-art correction facility. The facility can handle 150 prisoners. The complex includes a new sheriff's office. The new sheriff's provides offices for all administrative personnel as well as investigations offices.

Class-action suit against court and Sheriff's Office
In September 2014 the American Civil Liberties Union (ACLU) and the MacArthur Justice Center filed a federal class-action civil rights suit, Burks v. Scott County, against the County courts and the Scott County Sheriff's Office for violating suspects' rights, under the Sixth and Fourteenth amendments, to 1) defense counsel, 2) a speedy trial, 3) individualized bail determinations; and 4) freedom from excessive pre-trial detention.

The two plaintiffs had each been held for months in detention without access to a public defender before they were indicted or tried on the charges. "... Mr. Burks has spent over three years in the Scott County jail since August 30, 2009, on the three separate charges," the complaint states. "He has only been indicted once, he has never been to trial, and he has never been convicted."

The state does not require the county courts to issue indictments within any set period of time. The county courts call a grand jury only three times a year, so defendants have long waits in between.  At the time of indictment, the Scott County judges pick the public defender for each defendant, creating a conflict of interest. The ACLU notes that similar abuses exist in other Mississippi county court systems.
At the time of the suit, Brandon Buskey, a lawyer with the A.C.L.U.'s Criminal Law Reform Project, said that 53 of the 129 inmates in the Scott County Detention Center had not been indicted.

On September 23, 2014, these parties filed a federal class action lawsuit on behalf of several inmates in the Scott County Detention Center who had been detained for lengthy periods without counsel, fair bail arrangements, formal prosecution, or trial. They proposed the creation of three classes of plaintiffs, among persons who were treated similarly by the county courts.

As of November 2015, the case was ongoing. The US District Court dismissed the plaintiff's motion for a declaratory judgment in September 2015. It retained the claim for damages by the two named plaintiffs but dismissed the motions to certify three classes as moot, saying that defendants could bring up the claimed issues above with the county judges before indictment. The plaintiffs were thus denied class status by the court.

Media
The Scott County Times has served Scott County since 1939. It is a weekly publication owned by Emmerich Newspapers, Inc.

The Spirit of Morton has also been serving the Scott County area; its publisher/owner is Keisha Mason.

Communities

Cities
 Forest
 Morton

Towns
 Lake (partly in Newton County)
 Sebastopol (partly in Leake County)

Census-designated places
 Harperville
 Hillsboro

Other unincorporated communities

 Forkville
 Homewood
 Kalem
 Ludlow
 Midway
 Norris
 Pulaski

Education
School districts include:
 Forest Municipal School District
 Scott County School District

See also
 Bienville National Forest
 Dry counties
 Mississippi Snake Grabbers
 National Register of Historic Places listings in Scott County, Mississippi
 Roosevelt State Park

References

External links

 Official website of Scott County

 
Mississippi counties
1833 establishments in Mississippi
Populated places established in 1833
Majority-minority counties in Mississippi